HGS (Hızlı Geçiş Sistemi;  is an electronic toll collection system of radio-frequency identification (RFID) transponder type available on toll roads and toll bridges in Turkey. It is obtainable in a sticker or card form. Payment is handled by antenna on the toll booth, which collect money from the account associated with the tag. Additionally, smart cameras are used to detect the license plate and class of the vehicle. Despite these features, HGS is more cost-efficient compared to the OGS system.

It was implemented in September 17, 2012 to replace the slow KGS which needed drivers to stop at the booth to pay for the toll and caused congestion during rush hour. KGS was fully phased out by February 2013. 

It was used alongside the OGS (electronic toll collection) system, although OGS was retired on March 31, 2022.

HGS cards 
The cards used for the HGS consists of two types, stickers and cards. The technology used in the system is passive RFID. It is an unpowered, thin chipped sticker which is fixed on the windshield of the car. Thanks to protective technology, the sticker does not get damaged when being removed from the windshield.

Obtaining  
HGS stickers or cards can be obtained through PTT locations or approved banks country wide. While applying for HGS, the user needs to present their registration and their id card. If the registration is in the name of someone else, the application isn’t certain and might differ from institute to institute.

In Turkey, vehicles are classified in five classes at bridges and motorways. The fee for the sticker is ₺15 and the card is ₺30. The system used to have a minimum deposit of ₺30, but this was lifted after backlash. 

Prices change depending on distance and vehicle class. Vehicle classes are listed on the table below.

The law that passed on October 25, 2015 declared motorcycles as the sixth class. Motorcycles that are in the 6. Class are charged 50% of the 1. Class fee.

Thanks to smart classing vehicles that are classed according to axle number, the system is able to detect disabled axles during passing and charges the card accordingly.

Payment 
The HGS system uses a prepaid system. The account that is used for the card can be used for other purchases. It is required to have the necessary balance needed to pass the entrance fee. In the case required balance is not present, if the required fee is not added to the account within 15 days the user will be subjected to legal action. Passings that do not have the required balance will be charged four times the passing fee if required balance is not deposited within fifteen days.

See also 
 OGS (electronic toll collection)
 KGS (electronic toll collection)
 International E-road network
 Asian Highway Network
List of otoyol routes in Turkey
 General Directorate of Highways (Turkey)
 List of motorway tunnels in Turkey
Transport in Turkey
Otoyol

References 

Other

Electronic toll collection
Highways in Turkey